Paleobotany, which is also spelled as palaeobotany, is the branch of botany dealing with the recovery and identification of plant remains from geological contexts, and their use for the biological reconstruction of past environments (paleogeography), and the evolutionary history of plants, with a bearing upon the evolution of life in general. A synonym is paleophytology. It is a component of paleontology and paleobiology. The prefix palaeo- means "ancient, old",  and is derived from the Greek adjective , . Paleobotany includes the study of terrestrial plant fossils, as well as the study of prehistoric marine photoautotrophs, such as photosynthetic algae, seaweeds or kelp. A closely related field is palynology, which is the study of fossilized and extant spores and pollen.

Paleobotany is important in the reconstruction of ancient ecological systems and climate, known as paleoecology and paleoclimatology respectively; and is fundamental to the study of green plant development and evolution. Paleobotany has also become important to the field of archaeology, primarily for the use of phytoliths in relative dating and in paleoethnobotany.

The emergence of paleobotany as a scientific discipline can be seen in the early 19th century, especially in the works of the German palaeontologist Ernst Friedrich von Schlotheim, the Czech (Bohemian) nobleman and scholar Kaspar Maria von Sternberg, and the French botanist Adolphe-Théodore Brongniart.

Overview of the paleobotanical record
Macroscopic remains of true vascular plants are first found in the fossil record during the Silurian Period of the Paleozoic era. Some dispersed, fragmentary fossils of disputed affinity, primarily spores and cuticles, have been found in rocks from the Ordovician Period in Oman, and are thought to derive from liverwort- or moss-grade fossil plants.

An important early land plant fossil locality is the Rhynie Chert, found outside the village of Rhynie in Scotland.  The Rhynie chert is an Early Devonian sinter (hot spring) deposit composed primarily of silica. It is exceptional due to its preservation of several different clades of plants, from mosses and lycophytes to more unusual, problematic forms. Many fossil animals, including arthropods and arachnids, are also found in the Rhynie Chert, and it offers a unique window on the history of early terrestrial life.

Plant-derived macrofossils become abundant in the Late Devonian and include tree trunks, fronds, and roots. The earliest tree was thought to be Archaeopteris, which bears simple, fern-like leaves spirally arranged on branches atop a conifer-like trunk, though it is now known to be the recently discovered Wattieza.

Widespread coal swamp deposits across North America and Europe during the Carboniferous Period contain a wealth of fossils containing arborescent lycopods up to 30 meters tall, abundant seed plants, such as conifers and seed ferns, and countless smaller, herbaceous plants.

Angiosperms (flowering plants) evolved during the Mesozoic, and flowering plant pollen and leaves first appear during the Early Cretaceous, approximately 130 million years ago.

Plant fossils
A plant fossil is any preserved part of a plant that has long since died. Such fossils may be prehistoric impressions that are many millions of years old, or bits of charcoal that are only a few hundred years old. Prehistoric plants are various groups of plants that lived before recorded history (before about 3500 BC).

Preservation of plant fossils

Plant fossils can be preserved in a variety of ways, each of which can give different types of information about the original parent plant.  These modes of preservation are discussed in the general pages on fossils but may be summarised in a palaeobotanical context as follows.
Adpressions (compressions – impressions).  These are the most commonly found type of plant fossil.  They provide good morphological detail, especially of dorsiventral (flattened) plant parts such as leaves.  If the cuticle is preserved, they can also yield fine anatomical detail of the epidermis.  Little other detail of cellular anatomy is normally preserved.  
Petrifactions (permineralisations or anatomically preserved fossils).  These provide fine detail of the cell anatomy of the plant tissue.  Morphological detail can also be determined by serial sectioning, but this is both time consuming and difficult.
Moulds and casts.  These only tend to preserve the more robust plant parts such as seeds or woody stems.  They can provide information about the three-dimensional form of the plant, and in the case of casts of tree stumps can provide evidence of the density of the original vegetation.  However, they rarely preserve any fine morphological detail or cell anatomy.  A subset of such fossils are pith casts, where the centre of a stem is either hollow or has delicate pith.  After death, sediment enters and forms a cast of the central cavity of the stem.  The best known examples of pith casts are in the Carboniferous Sphenophyta (Calamites) and cordaites (Artisia).  
Authigenic mineralisations. These can provide very fine, three-dimensional morphological detail, and have proved especially important in the study of reproductive structures that can be severely distorted in adpressions.  However, as they are formed in mineral nodules, such fossils can rarely be of large size.
Fusain. Fire normally destroys plant tissue but sometimes charcoalified remains can preserve fine morphological detail that is lost in other modes of preservation; some of the best evidence of early flowers has been preserved in fusain.  Fusain fossils are delicate and often small, but because of their buoyancy can often drift for long distances and can thus provide evidence of vegetation away from areas of sedimentation.

Fossil-taxa

Plant fossils almost always represent disarticulated parts of plants; even small herbaceous plants are rarely preserved whole.  Those few examples of plant fossils that appear to be the remains of whole plants in fact are incomplete as the internal cellular tissue and fine micromorphological detail is normally lost during fossilisation.  Plant remains can be preserved in a variety of ways, each revealing different features of the original parent plant.

Because of these difficulties, palaeobotanists usually assign different taxonomic names to different parts of the plant in different modes of preservation. For instance, in the subarborescent Palaeozoic sphenophytes, an impression of a leaf might be assigned to the genus Annularia, a compression of a cone assigned to Palaeostachya, and the stem assigned to either Calamites or Arthroxylon depending on whether it is preserved as a cast or a petrifaction. All of these fossils may have originated from the same parent plant but they are each given their own taxonomic name. This approach to naming plant fossils originated with the work of Adolphe Brongniart and has stood the test of time.

For many years this approach to naming plant fossils was accepted by palaeobotanists but not formalised within the International Rules of Botanical Nomenclature.  Eventually,  and  proposed a set of formal provisions, the essence of which was introduced into the 1952 International Code of Botanical Nomenclature.  These early provisions allowed fossils representing particular parts of plants in a particular state of preservation to be referred to organ-genera.  In addition, a small subset of organ-genera, to be known as form-genera, were recognised based on the artificial taxa introduced by  mainly for foliage fossils.  Over the years, the concepts and regulations surrounding organ- and form-genera became modified within successive codes of nomenclature, reflecting a failure of the palaeobotanical community to agree on how this aspect of plant taxonomic nomenclature should work (a history reviewed by ). The use of organ- and fossil-genera was abandoned with the St Louis Code, replaced by "morphotaxa".

The situation in the Vienna Code of 2005 was that any plant taxon whose type is a fossil, except Diatoms, can be described as a morphotaxon, a particular part of a plant preserved in a particular way. Although the name is always fixed to the type specimen, the circumscription (i.e. range of specimens that may be included within the taxon) is defined by the taxonomist who uses the name.  Such a change in circumscription could result in an expansion of the range of plant parts and/or preservation states that can be incorporated within the taxon.  For instance, a fossil-genus originally based on compressions of ovules could be used to include the multi-ovulate cupules within which the ovules were originally borne.  A complication can arise if, in this case, there was an already named fossil-genus for these cupules.  If palaeobotanists were confident that the type of the ovule fossil-genus and of the cupule fossil-genus could be included in the same genus, then the two names would compete as to being the correct one for the newly emended genus.

Morphotaxa were introduced to try to overcome the issue of competing names that represented different plant parts and/or preservation states. What would you do if the species-name of a pollen-organ was pre-dated by the species name of the type of pollen produced by that pollen organ. It was argued that palaeobotanists would be unhappy if the pollen organs were named using the taxonomic name whose type specimen is a pollen grain. Palaeobotanists would have to be totally confident that the type specimen of the pollen species, which would normally be a dispersed grain, definitely came from the same plant that produced the pollen organ. We know from modern plants that closely related but distinct species can produce virtually indistinguishable pollen. It would seem that morphotaxa offer no real advantage to palaeobotanists over normal fossil-taxa and the concept was abandoned with the 2011 botanical congress and the 2012 International Code of Nomenclature for algae, fungi, and plants.

Fossil groups of plants

Some plants have remained almost unchanged throughout earth's geological time scale. Horsetails had evolved by the Late Devonian, early ferns had evolved by the Mississippian, conifers by the Pennsylvanian. Some plants of prehistory are the same ones around today and are thus living fossils, such as Ginkgo biloba and Sciadopitys verticillata. Other plants have changed radically, or became extinct.

Examples of prehistoric plants are:
Araucaria mirabilis
Archaeopteris
Calamites
Dillhoffia
Glossopteris
Hymenaea protera
Nelumbo aureavallis
Pachypteris
Palaeoraphe
Peltandra primaeva
Protosalvinia
Trochodendron nastae

Notable paleobotanists

 Edward W. Berry (1875–1945), paleoecology and phytogeography
 William Gilbert Chaloner (1928–2016)
 Isabel Cookson (1893–1973), early vascular plants, palynology
 Dianne Edwards (1942–), colonisation of land by early terrestrial floras
 Thomas Maxwell Harris (1903–1983), Mesozoic plants of Jameson Land (Greenland) and Yorkshire.
 Robert Kidston (1852–1924), early land plants, Devonian and Carboniferous floras, and their use in stratigraphy
 Ana María Ragonese (1928–1999), fossil wood morphology, spermatophytes
 Ethel Ida Sanborn (1883–1952), extinct flora of Oregon and the Western United States
 Birbal Sahni (1891–1949), Revision of Indian Gondwana Plants
 Dunkinfield Henry Scott (1854–1934), analysis of the structures of fossil plants
 Constantin von Ettingshausen (1826–1897), Tertiary floras
 Kaspar Maria von Sternberg (1761–1838), the "father of paleobotany"
 Franz Unger (1800–1870), pioneer in plant physiology, phytotomy and soil science
 Jack A. Wolfe (1936–2005), Tertiary paleoclimate of western North America
 Gilbert Arthur Leisman (1924–1996), known for work on Carboniferous lycophytes of central North America.

See also
 Cryptospores
 Evolutionary history of plants
 Paleophycology
 Prehistoric life
 Timeline of plant evolution

References

Further reading
 
 
 
 
 
 
 
 
 
 Wilson N. Stewart and Gar W. Rothwell. 2010. Paleobotany and the Evolution of Plants, Second edition. Cambridge University Press, Cambridge, UK. .
 Thomas N. Taylor, Edith L. Taylor, and Michael Krings. 2008. Paleobotany: The Biology and Evolution of Fossil Plants, 2nd edition. Academic Press (an imprint of Elsevier): Burlington, MA; New York, NY; San Diego, CA, USA, London, UK. 1252 pages. .

External links

 International Organisation of Paleobotany
 Botanical Society of America – Paleobotanical Section 
 Paleobotany Research Group, University Münster, Germany
 The Biota of Early Terrestrial Ecosystems: The Rhynie Chert, University of Aberdeen, UK
 Bibliography of Paleobotany
 The Sternberg Project
 PaleoNet – listservs and links related to paleontology
 Jurassic Park plants  Plants that lived when dinosaurs roamed the earth
 The International Fossil Plant Names Index (IFPNI): Global registry of scientific names of fossil organisms
 Links for Palaeobotanists

 
Botany
Branches of botany